The Super Ballon d'Or is the name of a prize that was awarded only once on 24 December 1989, by the French magazine France Football for the best football player of  the previous three decades. It is even more exclusive than the prestigious Ballon d'Or.

As of March 2023, this award has only been given once, to Spanish-Argentine forward Alfredo Di Stéfano. The award was voted between multiple-time Ballon d'Or winners. The winner of the award was voted by viewers and readers, a panel of France Football judges, and former Ballon d'Or winners. The viewers and readers voted Michel Platini as the best, but the France Football jury and former Ballon d'Or winners chose Alfredo Di Stéfano.

For many years, his Super Ballon d'Or trophy was on display at the Real Madrid museum at Santiago Bernabéu Stadium, but in 2021, Di Stéfano's children auctioned off his memorabilia. The trophy was among the items sold to an anonymous buyer for £187,500, and its current location is unknown.

Rankings

Winners

Votes 
Source:

See also
Ballon d'Or
FIFA Ballon d'Or
Ballon d'Or Féminin

References

Ballon d'Or